Sri Lankan Chetties also known as Colombo Chetties, is an ethnicity in the island of Sri Lanka. Formerly considered a Sri Lankan Tamil caste, they were classified as a separate ethnic group in the 2001 census. They were a class of Tamil speaking Hindu Vaishyas, who migrated from the South India under Portuguese rule.

Etymology 
The word Chetty is a generic term denoting all merchant and trading groups of South India. The word is thought to have been derived from the Tamil word Etti, an honorific title bestowed on the leading merchants by Tamil monarchs.

History

Most of them trace their origin from Madurai, Tirunelveli and the Coromandel Coast of Southern India. They settled mostly in western Sri Lanka, especially in the ports of Jaffna, Colombo and Galle from the 16th century to mid 17th century, during the rule of the Portuguese and Dutch. Some of the Chetties in Northern Sri Lanka were absorbed in other communities, mainly in the Sri Lankan Vellalar community, considered a subcaste known as Chetty Vellalar. The Chetties of Western Sri Lanka converted to various forms of Christianity during the colonial era: Roman Catholicism under Portuguese rule, as well as to Anglicanism and Reformed Christianity under British rule and Dutch rule, respectively. Intermarriage and alliances between Sinhalese and Chetties were not uncommon thus many also got Sinhalised.

Representatives of the Colombo Chetty Association stressed out their distinctiveness, appealing for forming a separate ethnic group. The Chetties were notably also from 1814 to 1817 listed as a separate ethnic group. The Chetties used dress distinctive from rest of the population in the colonial era.

As an elite and prosperous group they no longer strictly marry amongst themselves. In addition, migration to Australia, England, United States of America and Canada has tended to dilute their numbers.

See also
Tyron D. S. Silvapulle PWV, RWP. RWP 
Simon Casie Chetty 
Bharatakula
Nagarathar
Malacca Chitty
Jeyaraj Fernandopulle

References
Sources
 Casiechitty S, The Castes, Customs, Manners and Literature of the Tamils. Colombo: Ceylon Printers, 1934.
 Pulle Tissera Shirley - History of The Colombo Chetties - 2000
 Thurston E, Castes and Tribes of Southern India

Notes

External links
Dutch Burgher/Sri Lankan Chetty Combined Genealogy list
Sri Lankan Hydridity
Ondaatje Family history

 
Chetties
Chetties
Chetties
Sri Lankan Tamil castes
Sri Lankan people of Indian descent
Indians in Sri Lanka